In Greek mythology, Itonus (Ancient Greek: Ἴτωνος means 'willow—man'), also Itonius, may refer to two individuals:

 Itonus, king of Iton in Phthiotis and son of Amphictyon. He was married to Melanippe, a nymph, and had a son Boeotus and two daughters, Chromia and Iodame. He founded a sanctuary of Athena, where his daughter Iodame served as priestess. Itonis and Itonia, surnames of Athena, were believed to have been derived from his name. According to Graves, the myth of Itonus represents a claim by the Itonians that they worshipped Athene even before the Athenians did and his name shows that she had a willow cult in Phthiotis — like that of her counterpart, the goddess Anatha, at Jerusalem until Jehovah's priests ousted her and claimed the rain—making willow as his tree at the Feast of Tabernacles.

 Itonus, also the name of the son of another Boeotus (the son of Poseidon). He was the father of Electryon, Hippalcimus, Archilycus (Areilycus) and Alegenor; his grandsons were the Trojan War heroes Leitus, Peneleos, Prothoenor, Arcesilaus and Clonius.

Notes

References 

 Diodorus Siculus, The Library of History translated by Charles Henry Oldfather. Twelve volumes. Loeb Classical Library. Cambridge, Massachusetts: Harvard University Press; London: William Heinemann, Ltd. 1989. Vol. 3. Books 4.59–8. Online version at Bill Thayer's Web Site
 Diodorus Siculus, Bibliotheca Historica. Vol 1-2. Immanel Bekker. Ludwig Dindorf. Friedrich Vogel. in aedibus B. G. Teubneri. Leipzig. 1888-1890. Greek text available at the Perseus Digital Library.
Graves, Robert, The Greek Myths, Harmondsworth, London, England, Penguin Books, 1960. 
Graves, Robert, The Greek Myths: The Complete and Definitive Edition. Penguin Books Limited. 2017. 
 Pausanias, Description of Greece with an English Translation by W.H.S. Jones, Litt.D., and H.A. Ormerod, M.A., in 4 Volumes. Cambridge, MA, Harvard University Press; London, William Heinemann Ltd. 1918. . Online version at the Perseus Digital Library
 Pausanias, Graeciae Descriptio. 3 vols. Leipzig, Teubner. 1903.  Greek text available at the Perseus Digital Library.

Kings in Greek mythology
Boeotian characters in Greek mythology